Aventuras en el tiempo (English title: Adventures in Time) is a Mexican comedy drama telenovela produced by Rosy Ocampo for Televisa in 2001.

On March 19, 2001, Canal de las Estrellas started broadcasting Aventuras en el tiempo weekdays at 4:00pm, replacing Carita de Ángel. The last episode was broadcast on August 10, 2001 with María Belén replacing it the following Monday.

Maribel Guardia and Gerardo Murguía starred as adult protagonists, Belinda and Christopher von Uckermann starred as child protagonists, while Vanessa Guzmán and Odiseo Bichir starred as antagonists.

Plot 
Violeta lives with her uncle, because her mother died soon after she was born and she never knew her father. In addition to her uncle, Violeta stays with her grandmother from time to time as well. Violeta has a boyfriend named Ángel who gives her a pet dog.

While at her grandmother's house, Violeta discovers a time machine that her grandfather built, so she and her friends travel to different time periods. They visit several important events in Mexican history, learning these stories firsthand. The adults also end up traveling in time with the kids, and then it takes them all to recent time periods like the 1980s, where Violeta meets her mother and witnesses her own birth and her mother's death.

Later, she reunites with her father who is a well-respected doctor, and, after telling him and her uncle that she has found a time machine, they make a plan to save her mother the minute she gives birth to Violeta and take her to the future. Violeta's father successfully saves her mother.

Violeta's mother later wakes up and is told that she is in the future, and she sees that her daughter was the same girl who helped her to the hospital.

Cast

Maribel Guardia as Flor del Huerto
Gerardo Murguia as Marcos Flores Rosales
Belinda as Violeta Arcángel Flores
Christopher von Uckermann as Ángel del Huerto
Odiseo Bichir as Avaro Zopilote/Prof. Losthaim
Vanessa Guzmán as Faby Wolf
Mario Prudomme as Carlos Espino
Gustavo Aguilar as Mr. Malrostro
Juan Carlos Casasola as Lic. Chacal
Alejandro Speitzer as Ernesto "Neto" del Huerto
Naydelin Navarrete as Paloma
Enrique Sánchez as Alejandro
Ramiro Torres as Leonardo
Daniela Mercado as María José
Roberto Marín as Narciso Espino del Huerto
Carmen Montejo as Margarita Rosales de Flores
Marga López as Urraca Valdepeña
Maricruz Nájera as Mrs. Zopilote
Luis de Icaza as Kent Wolf 
Héctor Ortega as Kent Wolf 
Carlos Bracho as Geranio Flores
Pedro Weber "Chatanuga" as Don Manuel del Bosque Verdozo
Ricardo Chavez as Octavio
Roxana Saucedo as Yazmín
Javier Herranz as Jacinto del Huerto
Héctor Cruz as Rufiano
Greta Cervantes as Lidia
Martha Sabrina as Carla Espino
Mario Figueroa as Carlitos Espino
Mónica Riestra as Estefani
Bárbara Ferré as Begoña
Sergio Catalán as Luis Fernando Téllez
Nora Velázquez as Rocío del Bosque y Verduzco "Super Rocío"
Lourdes Munguía as Rosalba del Campo
Daniel Gauvry as Dr. Taimpress
Juan Pablo Gamboa as Salvador Arcángel
Roberto Tello as Méndez
Tomás Tamez as Rosales
Rafael del Villar as Luis del Monte
Yissmali Castillo as Maritza
Fernando Montaño as Rudolfín
Luis Couturier as Actor
Julio Camejo as Tony
Sergio Saldivar as Luigi
Luis Manuel Ávila as Police
Ricardo Vera as Severo Correa
Rubén Becerra as Sacerdote
Franco Gala as Obrero
Adriana Chapela as Angélica
Silvia Pinal as Herself
Martha Carrillo as Herself
Magneto as Themselves
Fabián Lavalle as Himself

Periods

Year 2470
Carlos Monden as Old Ángel del Huerto
Irán Eory as Old Violeta Flores
Rebeca Mankita as Adult Violeta Flores
Susan Vohn as Young Violeta Flores
Wendy González as Equis
Marco Uriel as Intelligence Chief

Year 1989
Irán Castillo as Azucena Flores Rosales

Year 1965
Susan Vohn as Young Margarita Rosales
Mayrín Villanueva as Young Urraca Valdepeña
Ernesto D'Alessio as "El Brother"
Alessandra Rosaldo as "La Flower"
Odiseo Bichir as Tacaño Zopilote
Gerardo Gallardo as Young Kent Wolf

Year 1950
Toño Infante as Epaminondas
Miguel Galván as Godofredo "El Godis"
Esther Rinaldi as Lupita
Melina Escobedo as Estrellita
Dolores Salomón "Bodokito" as Mercedes
Silvia Contreras as Cook Ranch
Pedro Romo as Rubén

Year 1910
Suzeth Cerame as María de la Luz
Marco Zapata as María de la Luz's brother

Year 1900
Lucía Guilmáin as Mrs. Crescencia Amargura de Limón
Amor Huerta as Dulce
Nancy Patiño as Vicenta
Karen Valencia as Juana
María Fernanda Malo as Blonde girl from the orphanage
Itzel Torres as Macrina
Belinda as Rosenda
Odiseo Bichir as Roñoso Zopilote
Miguel Priego as Mr. who adopts Dulce
Daniela Serratos
José Luis Cordero "Pocholo"

Year 1894
Odiseo Bichir as Roñoso Zopilote
Sylvia Pasquel as La Barbura
Susimar Logu as Child Rosenda
Diego Barquinero as Payasito Dieguín

Year 1885
Francis Laboriel as Princess Chorro de Humo
Yulyenette Anaya as African girl

Year 1810
Archie Lafranco as Don Rómulo
Joemy Blanco as Doña Isabel
Ernesto Laguardia as Insurgente
Francisco Rossel as Juan

Year 1790
Alejandra Meyer as Gitana

Year 1039
Salvador Sánchez as King Tlacay

Year 1000
Gabriel Ramos Villalpando as King Arturo

Soundtracks
 Aventuras en el tiempo
 Aventuras en el tiempo en vivo

Awards

References

External links
 at esmas.com 

2001 telenovelas
Mexican telenovelas
2001 Mexican television series debuts
2001 Mexican television series endings
2000s time travel television series
Spanish-language telenovelas
Television shows set in Mexico City
Mexican time travel television series
Televisa telenovelas
Children's telenovelas
Teen telenovelas
2000s science fiction television series